The First African Baptist Church of Richmond, Virginia is a prominent Black church. Founded in 1841, its members initially included both slaves and freedmen. It has since had a major influence on the local black community. At one point, it was one of the largest Protestant churches in the United States.

History
The First African Baptist Church was founded in 1841 by a group of black members of Richmond's First Baptist Church. The First Baptist Church housed a multiracial congregation from its beginning in 1802 until the white members of the congregation built a new church in 1841. In the years leading up to the split, whites were a minority at the church—a fact which made some of them uncomfortable. Many black members had also called for a split because they were often denied entrance after the building became crowded. After they built a new church building for the white members of the First Baptist Church, the church leadership sold the building that they had been meeting in to the black members. It was then renamed by adding "African" to the title. Most of its early slave members were initially from the Tidewater region of Virginia before they were hired to businesses in Richmond. Many freedmen traveled from other cities to attend its services, as well.

In 1866 James H. Holmes, a former slave and highly gifted preacher, was elected assistant pastor, and in 1867 pastor at the Church. Under Holmes, the church grew by leaps and bounds and became one of the largest churches in the country. In 1871 he baptized 600 people, in 1878 he baptized 1,100. In 1876 the original building was torn down and the congregation built a new church costing $35,000 and installed an organ costing $2,500, which was the largest organ in any African American church, in 1877.  The location of both the original church building and its replacement is at the corner of College Street and East Broad Street. The demolition of the original church building was an act which brought accusations of "a true lack of American veneration for old things" from Harpers Weekly. Architect Thomas U. Walter designed the new building, using a Greek Doric temple design. Many of the white congregations in Richmond used a similar style when constructing their churches.

The First African Baptist Church congregation moved in 1955. The church building was then sold to the Medical College of Virginia. Some church members characterized the sale as insensitive to the church's contribution to African-American history. The building now holds offices, classrooms, and laboratories.

Attendance 
At the time that the congregation split from the First Baptist Church there were approximately one thousand three hundred black members. It soon experienced rapid growth, and by 1861, the services were regularly attended by more than three thousand people. The number of members swelled to four thousand five hundred by 1869. There was a dispute in 1880 which caused over seven hundred members to leave the church. The New York Times wrote that approximately four thousand members remained after the split.

Events 
As one of the largest meeting halls in Richmond, it was often rented for white events. Its large interior and prominent location in Richmond made it a sought after venue for events such as concerts and political rallies. The practice of renting the church was controversial among members due to the use of a church for secular events and due to the racial segregation often imposed at the events. The practice continued, however, due in part to the significant income that it provided.

John Hartwell Cocke lectured on temperance at one of the earliest major events hosted at the church. While the government of the Confederate States of America was based in Richmond during the American Civil War, the church was often used for speeches by politicians including Governor William Smith and President Jefferson Davis. Judah Benjamin also spoke at the church to recruit blacks into the Confederate Army. In 1865 Horace Greely, abolitionist publisher of the New York Tribune spoke at the church regarding the post-Civil War Reconstruction.

Practices
Though it was a Black church from the time of its 1841 separation from the First Baptist Church, it was  led by a white minister and a board of thirty black deacons because it was illegal for blacks to preach. Though the majority of the members were slaves in the years before the Civil War, most of the early leaders were freedmen due to greater liberties that they possessed. The first pastor, Robert Ryland, served from 1841 until 1865. Ryland owned slaves and believed that slavery was the best way to convert Africans to Christianity. The church also sent several of its members to Africa as missionaries.

Though Virginia state law did not permit slaves to marry, the church would hold wedding ceremonies for its members. The church allowed slaves to divorce and remarry if their spouse were sold out of state.

Their services were marked by enthusiastic singing and exhortation and were a popular attraction for visitors to Richmond. There was a space located near the pulpit that was reserved for white visitors. Some white residents of Richmond frequently cited the positive tone of services there as proof that their slaves lived happy lives, much to the dismay of their slaves.

Even though it was against state law to teach blacks to read, Ryland published a catechism for members which allowed them to learn to read. This practice caused some controversy, but Ryland defended himself by citing the fact that his lessons emphasized submission to authority. His practice of educating slaves was initially controversial, in part due to a high-profile murder committed by a member of the congregation. Richmond's white churches eventually defused the situation by coming out in support of Ryland's educational programs. Ryland later touted the conservatism of his congregation against those who feared slave rebellions.

Some members were also allowed to occasionally preach from the pews, and some of the lay preachers were purchased from their owners and emancipated with funds raised by the church. It did not gain its first Black senior minister until 1867, however. The first Black man to serve as senior minister was James Holmes, a longtime deacon who was born a slave.

Founding members
Lucy Goode Brooks

Notes

Bibliography

Churches on the National Register of Historic Places in Virginia
African-American churches
Baptist churches in Virginia
19th-century Baptist churches in the United States
History of slavery in Virginia
Churches in Richmond, Virginia
1841 establishments in Virginia
Greek Revival church buildings in Virginia
Churches completed in 1876
Evangelical megachurches in the United States
Megachurches in Virginia
National Register of Historic Places in Richmond, Virginia
First African Baptist churches
African-American historic places